Granger is a city in Yakima County, Washington, United States. The population was 3,624 at the 2020 census.  Although it was classified as a town in 2000, it has since been reclassified as a city.

History
Granger was founded in 1902 and named after Walter Granger, superintendent of the Washington Irrigation Company who also laid out the cities of Zillah and Sunnyside. Granger was officially incorporated on September 28, 1909. In the 1910s and 20's, the town had several large industries including a tile and brick company and a cider mill.

The Granger Farm Workers Camp, which opened in May, 1941 two miles north of the city, became known as the Crewport, Washington Farm Labor Camp. It was built by the Farm Security Administration to house Dust Bowl refugees, initially White, and later Mexican Americans, who were brought in to work in the Yakima Valley as a result of World War II labor shortages. The camp closed in the late 1960s.

The Latin radio station "Radio Cadena" or "Radio KDNA" building is in the town of Granger, and was first built in 1979. It was an activist radio station that educated farm workers, advocated farm workers' organizations, and provided Spanish language programs to non-English speaking families. In 2008, a new station building was built.

Geography
Granger is located at  (46.344319, -120.191290).

Demographics

2010 census
As of the census of 2010, there were 3,246 people, 774 households, and 675 families living in the city. The racial makeup of the city was 48.6% White, 0.4% African American, 1.7% Native American, 0.5% Asian, 46.9% from other races, and 1.9% from two or more races. Hispanic or Latino of any race were 88.2% of the population.

There were 774 households, of which 66.3% had children under the age of 18 living with them, 60.2% were married couples living together, 17.6% had a female householder with no husband present, 9.4% had a male householder with no wife present, and 12.8% were non-families. 10.5% of all households were made up of individuals, and 4.5% had someone living alone who was 65 years of age or older. The average household size was 4.14 and the average family size was 4.41.

The median age in the city was 22.2 years. 43% of residents were under the age of 18; 11% were between the ages of 18 and 24; 26.4% were from 25 to 44; 14.9% were from 45 to 64; and 4.8% were 65 years of age or older. The gender makeup of the city was 50.5% male and 49.5% female.

2000 census
As of the census of 2000, there were 2,530 people, 570 households, and 501 families living in the town. The population density was 2,019.7 people per square mile (781.5/km2). There were 609 housing units at an average density of 486.2 per square mile (188.1/km2). The racial makeup of the town was 20.20% White, 0.79% Native American, 76.36% from other races, and 2.65% from two or more races. Hispanic or Latino of any race were 85.53% of the population.

There were 570 households, out of which 60.5% had children under the age of 18 living with them, 68.2% were married couples living together, 13.3% had a female householder with no husband present, and 12.1% were non-families. 9.8% of all households were made up of individuals, and 4.4% had someone living alone who was 65 years of age or older. The average household size was 4.44 and the average family size was 4.69.

In the town the age distribution of the population shows 43.0% under the age of 18, 14.2% from 18 to 24, 25.5% from 25 to 44, 12.2% from 45 to 64, and 5.1% who were 65 years of age or older. The median age was 21 years. For every 100 females, there were 105.5 males. For every 100 females age 18 and over, there were 101.8 males.

The median income for a household in the town was $26,250, and the median income for a family was $28,026. Males had a median income of $21,458 versus $20,000 for females. The per capita income for the town was $8,111. About 28.5% of families and 34.3% of the population were below the poverty line, including 43.3% of those under age 18 and 21.4% of those age 65 or over.

Trivia

 There are 32 life-size dinosaur models on display around the town of Granger. They are made from a skeleton of steel rods and chicken wire which is then packed with a cement mix. The idea of using a dinosaur exhibit to attract tourists was first mooted in 1993 and the first dinosaur was produced in 1994.
Fred Oldfield, a cowboy and noted artist, is originally from Alfalfa, a subdivision of Granger.

References

Cities in Washington (state)
Cities in Yakima County, Washington
Populated places established in 1902
1902 establishments in Washington (state)
Populated places on the Yakima River